Fulvio Lucisano (born 1 August 1928) is an Italian film producer. In 2005 he was honored with a retrospective ("Homage to Fulvio Lucisano") at the 62nd Venice International Film Festival.

Selected filmography
 Planet of the Vampires (1965)
 Dr. Goldfoot and the Girl Bombs (1966)
 Due croci a Danger Pass (1967)
 Down the Ancient Staircase (1975)
 Blue Belle (1976)
 La notte degli squali (1988)
 Fantozzi 2000 – La clonazione (1999)
 My Life with Stars and Stripes (2003)
 Notte prima degli esami (2006)
 Ex (2009)
 Ex – Amici come prima! (2011)

References

External links

1928 births
Living people
Italian film producers
Film people from Rome
Nastro d'Argento winners